EGW, E.G.W is a three-letter abbreviation which may refer to:

 Electrogas welding
 Ellen G. White, a co-founder of the Seventh-day Adventist Church
 External genital warts, a common name for herpes genitalis